Grønliskarstinden  is a mountain on the border of Lesja Municipality in Innlandet county and Sunndal Municipality in Møre og Romsdal county in Norway.

See also
List of mountains of Norway

References

Mountains of Innlandet
Mountains of Møre og Romsdal
Lesja